Chapel Hill Cumberland Presbyterian Church is a historic Cumberland Presbyterian church in Chapel Hill, Tennessee.

The church building, on Main Street in Chapel Hill, was built in 1866 and added to the National Register of Historic Places in 1985.

References

Presbyterian churches in Tennessee
Churches on the National Register of Historic Places in Tennessee
Churches completed in 1866
19th-century Presbyterian church buildings in the United States
Buildings and structures in Marshall County, Tennessee
1866 establishments in Tennessee
Cumberland Presbyterian Church
National Register of Historic Places in Marshall County, Tennessee